The Russian Bank for Foreign Trade was one of a group of banks in Saint Petersburg that played an important part in Russian international trade in the second half of the nineteenth century and up to the Russian Revolution in 1917. The bank was one of the largest in Russia prior to the revolution. The bank was nationalised by a decree of 14 December 1917 leading to a legal battle in France over its deposits in that country.

Building in St. Petersburg
Since 1888, the bank was located in its own building in St. Petersburg at 32 Bolshaya Morskaya Street, which was acquired by the bank in 1887–1888 and rebuilt according to the design of the architect Victor Schröter with the participation of N. Makarov. 

In 1915–1916, at Bolshaya Morskaya Street, 18, the construction of the building of the bank was started (but not completed due to the revolution) designed by architects Fyodor Lidval and Leon Benois, but now in this building, completed in 1929-1931, the State University of Technology and Design is located.

References 

Companies based in Saint Petersburg
Defunct banks of Russia
Cultural heritage monuments of federal significance in Saint Petersburg